Threshold is a space-themed fixed shooter written by Warren Schwader and Ken Williams for the Apple II and published by On-Line Systems in 1981. Inspired by Sega's Astro Blaster arcade video game, Threshold introduces many enemy ship types and wave formations as the game progresses. Reviewers found the variety distinguished the game from the many similar shoot 'em ups.

Ports to other systems were released on ROM cartridge: Atari 8-bit family and VIC-20 in 1981, Commodore 64 in 1983, and ColecoVision and Thomson computers in 1984. An Atari 2600 adaptation was published by Tigervision in 1982.

Schwader also wrote the 1983 Apple II platform game Sammy Lightfoot.

Gameplay
The player controls the spaceship Threshold, using its laser weapon to destroy waves of alien attackers. When a wave is eliminated, another appears. As in Astro Blaster, firing the laser increases its temperature, and it cools when not in use. If the temperature bar fills completely, then the weapon cannot be used until it fully cools. Once per ship, pulling back on the joystick activates a "warp drive" that slows the action down.

Development
The game was inspired by Ken Williams playing an Astro Blaster arcade machine in a store and calling Warren Schwader. In an interview in Halcyon Days, Schwader said: 

It took two months to implement. Williams only worked on the project for two weeks of that time, writing the Apple II animation routines.

Reception
Threshold sold approximately 25,000 copies. Tigervision's Atari 2600 port received a "Certificate of Merit" in the "Best Science Fiction/Fantasy Videogame" category of the 1983 Arcade Awards.

Reviewing the Apple II original for Creative Computing, David Lubar wrote, "The animation in Threshold is superb", and he found the number of enemy types and waves to be a strong point. The Book of Atari Software 1983 gave the Atari 8-bit port a B rating: "It's the usual scenario, with this exception: the game offers unusual depth and variety." They found they sometimes mistook the stars in the animated background as enemy bullets.  In Ahoy! magazine, R.J. Michaels led off his review with, "Only humor saves this game from being a run of the mill slide-and-shoot burn-the-alien-invaders game."

Appraising the Atari 8-bit computer version, Electronic Games noticed the Astro Blaster connection and wrote "The graphics in Threshold are tremendous."  The reviewer disliked the loading that occurs every so often between levels and found the game overall too difficult.

References

External links
Threshold for the Atari 8-bit family at Atari Mania
Threshold at Gamebase 64
Review in Antic
Review in Softalk
Review in Creative Computing
Review in Creative Computing

1981 video games
Alien invasions in video games
Apple II games
Atari 8-bit family games
Atari 2600 games
VIC-20 games
Commodore 64 games
ColecoVision games
Fixed shooters
Video game clones
Video games developed in the United States